The North of Scotland Football Association is a local football association affiliated to the Scottish Football Association. Member clubs are drawn from across the Highlands and Moray and includes teams playing in the Scottish Professional Football League, the Highland League and the North Caledonian League.

Competitions
The main competition organised by the association is the North of Scotland Cup.

Member clubs

Scottish Professional Football League
Elgin City
Inverness CT
Ross County

Scottish Highland Football League
Brora Rangers
Clachnacuddin
Forres Mechanics
Fort William
Lossiemouth
Nairn County
Rothes
Strathspey Thistle
Wick Academy

North Caledonian Football League
Golspie Sutherland
Halkirk Utd
Muir of Ord Rovers
Thurso

References

Scottish Football Association
Football governing bodies in Scotland
Football in Highland (council area)
Football in Moray